Lividoconus is a subgenus  of sea snails, marine gastropod mollusks in the genus Conus, family Conidae, the cone snails and their allies.

In the latest classification of the family Conidae by Puillandre N., Duda T.F., Meyer C., Olivera B.M. & Bouchet P. (2015), Lividoconus has become a subgenus of Conus as Conus (Lividoconus) Wils, 1970 (type species Conus lividus Hwass in Bruguière, 1792) represented as Conus Linnaeus, 1758

Distinguishing characteristics
The Tucker & Tenorio 2009 taxonomy distinguishes Lividoconus from Conus in the following ways:

 Genus Conus sensu stricto Linnaeus, 1758
 Shell characters (living and fossil species)
The basic shell shape is conical to elongated conical, has a deep anal notch on the shoulder, a smooth periostracum and a small operculum. The shoulder of the shell is usually nodulose and the protoconch is usually multispiral. Markings often include the presence of tents except for black or white color variants, with the absence of spiral lines of minute tents and textile bars.
Radular tooth (not known for fossil species)
The radula has an elongated anterior section with serrations and a large exposed terminating cusp, a non-obvious waist, blade is either small or absent and has a short barb, and lacks a basal spur.
Geographical distribution
These species are found in the Indo-Pacific region.
Feeding habits
These species eat other gastropods including cones.

 Subgenus Lividoconus Wils, 1970
Shell characters (living and fossil species)
The shell is obconic in shape.  The protoconch is multispiral.  The shell is ornamented with nodules which either persist or die out in the outer whorls.  The anal notch is shallow.  The shell has a distinct interior color layer and well developed constrictions inside the aperture.  The anterior end of the shell is blue-black, blue or brown in color.  The periostracum is tufted, and the operculum is small to moderate in size.
Radular tooth (not known for fossil species)
The radular tooth is elongated, and the anterior section of the radular tooth is equal to slightly longer than the length of posterior section.  A basal spur is present, and the barb and blade are short.  A partially exposed terminating cusp is present.
Geographical distribution
The majority of the species in this genus occur in the Indo-Pacific region, and one species occurs in the Eastern-Pacific region..
Feeding habits
These cone snails are vermivorous, meaning that the cones prey on a broad variety of polychaete worms, including enteropneust, eunicid, terebellid, cirratulid, maldanid, and nereid worms, and hemichordates.

Species list
This list of species is based on the information in the World Register of Marine Species (WoRMS) list. Species within the genus Lividoconus include:

 Lividoconus biliosus (Röding, 1798) is equivalent to Conus biliosus (Röding, 1798)
 Lividoconus conco (Puillandre, Stöcklin, Favreau, Bianchi, Perret, Rivasseau, Limpalaër, Monnier & Bouchet, 2015): synonym of Conus conco Puillandre, Stöcklin, Favreau, Bianchi, Perret, Rivasseau, Limpalaër, Monnier & Bouchet, 2015
 Lividoconus diadema (G.B. Sowerby I, 1834) is equivalent to Conus diadema G. B. Sowerby I, 1834
 Lividoconus floridulus (A. Adams & Reeve, 1848) is equivalent to Conus floridulus A. Adams & Reeve, 1848
 Lividoconus lividus (Hwass in Bruguière, 1792) is equivalent to Conus lividus Hwass in Bruguière, 1792
 Lividoconus muriculatus (G.B. Sowerby I, 1833) is equivalent to Conus muriculatus G. B. Sowerby I, 1833
 Lividoconus sanguinolentus (Quoy & Gaimard, 1834) is equivalent to Conus sanguinolentus Quoy & Gaimard, 1834

References

Further reading 
 Kohn A. A. (1992). Chronological Taxonomy of Conus, 1758-1840". Smithsonian Institution Press, Washington and London.
 Monteiro A. (ed.) (2007). The Cone Collector 1: 1-28.
 Berschauer D. (2010). Technology and the Fall of the Mono-Generic Family The Cone Collector 15: pp. 51-54
 Puillandre N., Meyer C.P., Bouchet P., and Olivera B.M. (2011), Genetic divergence and geographical variation in the deep-water Conus orbignyi complex (Mollusca: Conoidea)'', Zoologica Scripta 40(4) 350-363.

External links
 To World Register of Marine Species
  Gastropods.com: Conidae setting forth the genera recognized therein.

Conidae
Gastropod subgenera